Julius Deutsch (February 2, 1884, Lackenbach, Austria-Hungary – January 17, 1968, Vienna, Austria) was a politician of the Social Democratic Workers' Party of Austria, member of Parliament between 1920-1933 and co-founder and leader of the Social Democrat militia "Republikanischer Schutzbund" (Republican Defense Association).

Leader of the Schutzbund

Julius Deutsch founded the "Schutzbund" in 1923 as an answer to the paramilitary organization "Heimwehr" (Home Guard), which was ideologically related to the Christian Social Party. He remained its leader until its destruction in 1934.

Schutzbund members were primarily recruited out of the "Deutschösterreichische Volkswehr" (German-Austrian People's Guard). It had been organized by Deutsch himself as Under Secretary of State in the Department of Armed Forces (November 1918 until March 1919) and as Secretary of State in the Department of Armed Forces (March 1919 until October 1920).

After the defeat of the Republican Guard during the Austrian Civil War of 1934 and the following ban on the Social Democrats, he fled to the city of Brno in Czechoslovakia.

Emigration
From 1936 until 1939 Deutsch fought as General of the Republican troops in the Spanish Civil War.

1939 he moved to Paris and worked for the foreign representation of the Austrian Socialists (AVOES). After the occupation of France by National Socialist Germany, Deutsch, who was of Jewish descent, had to emigrate again, this time to the United States of America. He returned to Austria in 1946. Deutsch was also the President of the Socialist Workers' Sport International.

Deutsch was married three times, to Josefine Schall, the mother of Grethe/Gretl Deutsch, b. 1908; to Maria Herzmansky b. 1884 mother of Hedwig (Hexi) Kramer; and to the novelist Adrienne Thomas, b. 1897.  
After his death, a Vienna apartment complex "Julius-Deutsch-Hof" was named in his honor.

Julius Deutsch was also an uncle of Karl Wolfgang Deutsch, a renowned German-American social and political scientist; the grandfather of Canadian economist Gerald Karl Helleiner; and great-grandfather of Canadian political scientist Eric Helleiner.

Works
Julius Deutsch: Antifascism, Sports, Sobriety: Forging a Militant Working-Class Culture. Selected Writings. Edited and translated by Gabriel Kuhn. PM Press: Oakland, 2017.
Julius Deutsch: Antifascism. Proletarian ability to put up a fight in the battle against Fascism. Vienna 1926
 
in "Aufbau":
The political emigration speaks (Die politische Emigration spricht), Jg. 8. 1942, Nr. 14 (3. April 1942), S. 5
New Austria (Das neue Oesterreich), Jg. 9. 1943, Nr. 45 (5. November 1943), S. 1
The new Government in Austria (Die neue Regierung in Oesterreich), Jg. 11. 1945, Nr. 18 (4. Mai 1945), S. 3
 
in "New Forward" (Vorwärts):
Travelling impressions in America (Reiseeindruecke in Amerika), Nr. 84 (20. Januar 1935), Beilage, S. 1
 
in the "Parisian daily News": (Pariser Tageszeitung):
From defense to offense (Von der Defensive in die Offensive), Jg. 2. 1937, Nr. 406 (24. Juli 1937), S. 1
Spains battle for Freedom - the honor of democracy (Spaniens Freiheitskampf – die Ehre der Demokratie), Jg. 3. 1938, Nr. 568 (2. Januar 1938), S. 2
 
in the "Socialist Observatory" (Sozialistische Warte):
A clear answer (Eine eindeutige Antwort), Jg. 14. 1939, Nr. 33 (18. August 1939), S. 793

References

External links 
 Julius Deutsch at the Third Workers' Olympiad, Antwerp, 1937 (photo)
 Recordings with Julius Deutsch in the Online Archive of the Österreichische Mediathek (in German). Retrieved 29 July 2019

1884 births
1968 deaths
People from Oberpullendorf District
People from the Kingdom of Hungary
Jewish Austrian politicians
Social Democratic Party of Austria politicians
Austrian Ministers of Defence
Members of the Constituent National Assembly (Austria)
Members of the National Council (Austria)
Jewish socialists
Austro-Hungarian military personnel of World War I
Austrian Civil War
Austrian people of the Spanish Civil War